Martín Nicolás Comachi (born 22 October 1991) is an Argentine professional footballer who plays as a centre-forward for All Boys.

Career
Comachi began his career with Colón. He was on the substitutes bench for Primera División fixtures with Vélez Sarsfield, Estudiantes and Independiente across three seasons from 2010–11 but never made it onto the field of play. Mario Sciacqua awarded Comachi his professional bow on 12 October 2013 against All Boys, with the forward featuring twelve times in 2013–14 as Colón suffered relegation. He spent the subsequent 2014 campaign on loan with San Jorge. Five appearances followed. In January 2016, Comachi joined Ecuadorian Serie B side Deportivo Quito. He scored once and appeared seven times in 2016.

Comachi spent the 2016–17 season in Torneo Federal A with Sportivo Las Parejas, where he netted six total goals, which preceded him playing for fellow third tier outfit Unión Sunchales in 2017–18. On 12 June 2018, Comachi was signed by Villa Dálmine of Primera B Nacional. His first appearance came in a 3–0 victory over Instituto on 25 August, before his opening goal arrived on 15 September versus Mitre. A further goal came against Atlético de Rafaela, in the midst of twenty-two total appearances. July 2019 saw Comachi join Agropecuario. He'd score nine goals in nine different games before the season's early curtailment.

On 9 October 2020, Comachi moved abroad for the second time in his career after signing for Uruguayan Primera División side Danubio. He netted his first goal on 19 December in a 4–1 home loss to Peñarol. In April 2021, his contract with Danubio was terminated.

In July 2021, Comachi joined Instituto Atlético Central Córdoba on a deal until the end of 2022. However, he left the club in February 2022 to join Primera Nacional club All Boys.

Personal life
Comachi's brother, Lucas, is also a professional footballer; they were both produced by Colón's youth system. Their father, Marcelo, also played football at pro level.

Career statistics
.

References

External links

1991 births
Living people
Footballers from Santa Fe, Argentina
Argentine footballers
Association football forwards
Argentine expatriate footballers
Expatriate footballers in Ecuador
Expatriate footballers in Uruguay
Argentine expatriate sportspeople in Ecuador
Argentine expatriate sportspeople in Uruguay
Argentine Primera División players
Torneo Federal A players
Ecuadorian Serie B players
Primera Nacional players
Uruguayan Primera División players
Club Atlético Colón footballers
San Jorge de Tucumán footballers
S.D. Quito footballers
Sportivo Las Parejas footballers
Unión de Sunchales footballers
Villa Dálmine footballers
Club Agropecuario Argentino players
Danubio F.C. players
Instituto footballers
All Boys footballers